= Take In Hollow, West Virginia =

Take In Hollow
- Unincorporated community
- Location within the state of West Virginia Take In Hollow (the United States)
- Coordinates: 37°43′55″N 81°13′3″W
- Country: United States
- State: West Virginia
- County: Raleigh

Government
  - [[ Mayor --> Raleigh County Commission]]: Daniel Hal, District I
- Elevation: 2,244 ft (684 m)
- Time zone: UTC-5 (Eastern (EST))
  - Summer (DST): UTC-4 (EDT)
- GNIS ID: 2747516

Take In Hollow is an unincorporated community in Raleigh County, West Virginia, United States.
